Monsignor Francis J. Weber (born January 22, 1933) is an American Roman Catholic priest, author and archivist. He is a noted Catholic scholar, an Honorary Chaplain to His Holiness, and archivist for the Archdiocese of Los Angeles since 1962.

Biography
Msgr. Weber was born Frank J. Weber in Indianapolis, Indiana to Frank J. and Katherine E. Thompson Weber.  He has one sister, Mary Alice Weber.  In December of 1945 the family moved to Los Angeles, California where he entered Los Angeles College, a Catholic junior seminary, in 1946.  Later he attended St. John’s College and St. John’s Seminary in Camarillo.	

While on the seminary campus, he worked at the Edward Laurence Doheny Memorial Library.   He was ordained a Catholic  priest April 30, 1959. From 1959 to 1961 he served as Assistant Pastor of St. Vincent Catholic Church in West Hollywood and Assistant Director of the National Legion of Decency.  

Father Weber was sent to Washington, D.C. to do post-graduate studies at Catholic University of America. He also earned a certificate in Records Management from American University. 

In 1962 Father Weber was selected to be the founding archivist for the Archives of the Archdiocese of Los Angeles where he continues to serve. 

Also in 1962, Msgr. Patrick Roche, the editor, asked Father Weber to write a regular column on California history in  The Tidings, the official newspaper of the Archdiocese of Los Angeles.  Thus was launched “California’s Catholic Heritage,” which became, before it ended in 1995, the longest-running column in the newspaper’s 121-year history. Msgr. Weber contributed 1,874 consecutive weekly columns over the course of 33 years.	

On May 7, 1974, His Holiness Pope Paul VI designated Father Weber as a “Chaplain of His Holiness” and his ecclesiastical title became the Reverend Monsignor, customarily abbreviated Msgr.

Honors
Msgr. Weber received the Award of Merit from the California Historical Society in 1972.

In 1993 Msgr. Weber was awarded the Grand Cross of the Order of Isabella the Catholic by King Juan Carlos I of Spain in recognition of his numerous books and articles on California’s Spanish heritage.  

A member and past president of the Los Angeles Corral, Msgr. Weber was honored as Westerners International Living Legend No. 60 in 2016.

In 1996 the Glasgow Cup was awarded Msgr. Weber by the President of the Miniature Book Society "To a member who has shown a special dedication and above all, friendship to the membership, and who keeps that special spirit so evident at our founding in 1983." He was a charter member of the Miniature Book Society and served as President from 1985-1987. 

In 2013 he was honored by the Miniature Book Society again when he was presented with the Norman W. Forgue Award from for his outstanding contribution to the world of miniature books.

Published works
As author or editor of 175 volumes, Msgr. Weber is one of the most published priests in the Catholic annals of the United States. He has been a columnist, and an author of both books and articles as well as a book reviewer. 
Msgr. Weber's diverse literary topics range from Buffalo Bills Baptism to Toiletry at the California Missions.

Msgr. Weber has written or edited miniature books for nearly all the top publishers of miniature books over several decades.  He has also published many books under his own imprints, Junipero Serra Press and El Camino Real Press.

Selected books
1965: Documents of California Catholic History (1784-1963)  
1977: A history of San Buenaventura Mission
1985: Mission in the valley of the bears: a documentary history of San Luis, Obispo de Tolosa
1992:  Past is Prologue: Some Historical Reflections, 1961-1991
1998:  Magnificat: the Life and Times of Timothy Cardinal Manning 
2000: Memories of an Old Country Priest
2000: Encyclopedia of California’s Catholic Heritage 1769-1999 
2002: Past is Prologue: Some Historical Reflections, 1992-2002
2003: A legacy of healing:the story of Catholic health care in the Archdiocese of Los Angeles 
2005: The California Missions

Selected miniature books	
1971: Earthquake Memoir
1975: California on United States Postage Stamps
1978: El Pueblo de San Jose de Guadalupe
1983: The XXIII Olympiad
1990: Gaspar de Portola
2004: The Veil of Veronica
2016: The Feast of the Nativity
2017: Gregory Peck
2019: Voice of the Hollywood Bowl: Thomas Cassidy 1917-2012
2021: Saint Brendan: legend vs. history

References

External links
Monsignor Francis J. Weber: Apostolate for Holy Relics

1933 births
Living people
Roman Catholic Archdiocese of Los Angeles
History of Catholicism in the United States
Catholic University of America alumni